The Express 35 is a Canadian sailboat, that was designed by Steve Killing and first built in 1984.

Production
The design was built by Goman Boat Limited in Midland, Ontario Canada and later by Express Yachts in the same Midland Ontario facility, after the two companies merged. Goman Boat Limited was founded by two former C&C Yachts employees, Bill Goman and Steve Killing.

Design
The Express 35 is a recreational keelboat, built predominantly of fiberglass, with wood trim. It has a masthead sloop rig, a raked stem, a reverse transom, an internally-mounted spade-type rudder controlled by a wheel and a fixed fin keel. It displaces  and carries  of ballast.

The boat is fitted with an inboard engine.

A tall mast version was also produced, with a mast about  higher than standard.

See also
List of sailing boat types

Similar sailboats
C&C 34/36
C&C 35
C&C 36R
Cal 35
Cal 35 Cruise
Freedom 35
Goderich 35
Hughes 36
Hughes-Columbia 36
Hunter 35 Legend
Hunter 35.5 Legend
Hunter 356
Island Packet 35
J/35
Landfall 35
Mirage 35
Niagara 35
Southern Cross 35

References

External links

Keelboats
1980s sailboat type designs
Sailing yachts
Sailboat type designs by Steve Killing
Sailboat types built by Goman Boat Limited
Sailboat types built by Express Yachts